Anne Savage may refer to:

Anne Savage (artist) (1896–1971), Canadian painter and art teacher
Anne Savage (DJ) (born 1969), English disc jockey
Anne Savage, maiden name of Anne Berkeley, Baroness Berkeley ( 1496–before 1546), lady-in-waiting to Anne Boleyn, second wife of Henry VIII of England

See also
Ann Savage (1921–2008), American actress
Anna Savage (disambiguation)